Gloeosporium theae-sinensis (syn. Colletotrichum theae-sinensis) is a plant pathogen.

References

External links 
 Index Fungorum
 USDA ARS Fungal Database

Dermateaceae
Fungal plant pathogens and diseases